Johnny Rahm  (June 11, 1965 – November 7, 2004) was the stage name of Barry "J.T." Rogers, an American former gay pornographic film actor and magazine model.

Biography

Christian upbringing 
Barry Thomas Rogers, who was known to friends as "J.T.," was born in Milledgeville, Georgia, and raised in a conservative Baptist home. He had two sisters and a brother. He attended Gilead Christian Academy, a Christian high school in Macon, Georgia and the fundamentalist Bob Jones University (BJU) in Greenville, South Carolina. Rogers was expelled from the university midway through his senior year when he chose to come out.  He had a Celtic cross tattooed above his right biceps, clearly visible in all his pornographic films.

Rogers had minor roles in films outside of the gay porn industry. He was an extra in the made-for-TV movie Unconquered, was twice a contestant on The Dating Game (winning once), and appeared on the Jerry Lewis MDA Telethon as a Jerry Lewis impersonator.

Gay porn star 
In 1988, Rogers moved to California and worked for more than a decade in the gay pornography industry, often making films for Chi Chi LaRue.  He won two Adult Erotic Gay Video Awards: "Best Supporting Actor" in 1993 for the film Body Search (directed by Chi Chi LaRue) and in 1995 for All about Steve he also won the AVN Award for "Best Supporting Actor" for the latter film. He also was employed at Drakes Melrose, Pier One Imports, and worked as a barback for the Atlanta club, "The Metro".

He moved to Atlanta, Georgia, in 1999 and tried stand-up comedy, but he struggled financially.  After being diagnosed as HIV-positive, he continued to make pornographic films, working with Atlanta-based producer Dick Wadd to make hardcore and bareback sex films.

Suicide 
After April 2004, Rogers shared a house with his friend Adam Kahn in midtown Atlanta and sought financial assistance to find a home of his own. Rogers suffered from chronic depression, and lived with both HIV and hepatitis. He committed suicide on 7 November 2004 by hanging himself with wire on the fence of the Atlanta Botanical Garden. A suicide note complained of his frustration at not being able to receive assistance from Social Security.

After his death, his cousin Jamey Rousey, who worked with the Atlanta AIDS Partnership Fund, called Rogers "a kind and gentle soul, and as tragic as his death was, I hope he’s found the peace he couldn’t find in life."

Partial videography 
 Bachelor Party: Big Switch 3 (Catalina Video)
 Body Search (1993, HIS Video)
 Brotherly Love 2 (1991, Stallion Video)
 Movers & Shakers (Vivid Man)
 On the Lookout (Jocks Video Pac 46)
 Pigs at the Troff (Dickwadd)
 Steamy Summer

See also
 List of pornographic movie studios
 List of male performers in gay porn films

Notes

External links 
 Gay Erotic Video Index Entry
 
 Johnny Rahm on Find A Grave
 Express Gay News discussion of Rahm's suicide
 A poem encapsulating the life and death of Johnny Rahm by Brad Walton

1965 births
2004 suicides
American actors in gay pornographic films
American male pornographic film actors
Suicides by hanging in Georgia (U.S. state)
LGBT-related suicides
Pornographic film actors from Georgia (U.S. state)
20th-century American male actors
People from Milledgeville, Georgia
People with HIV/AIDS